Draco haematopogon, the red-bearded flying dragon or yellow-bearded gliding lizard, is a species of agamid lizard. It is found in Indonesia and Malaysia.

References

Draco (genus)
Reptiles of Indonesia
Reptiles of Malaysia
Reptiles described in 1831
Taxa named by John Edward Gray
Reptiles of Borneo